On the Television is the cable network Nick at Nite’s first attempt at original late-night programming. The sketch comedy show, can be described as a satirical television critic show in the style of Siskel and Ebert. The one line pitch was "a fake Siskel and Ebert reviewing fake TV shows."  It starred Tim Conway Jr. and George McGrath as Dan Clark and Kevin Rush respectively. The show began as an April Fool's Day special for Nick at Nite, which featured Taylor Negron co-hosting with McGrath.

Overview
The shows were typically broad satires on people and other television shows as well as just being humorous and odd. Some of the shows that were reviewed were:

“The Richard Cabinetmaker Story” - Satire of the Karen Carpenter TV movie.
“The Valerie Harper Only Show,” - A sitcom starring Harper in a lighthouse refusing visits from guest stars.
“A Recent Occurrence,” - satire of A Current Affair.
“Carmela!” - an Italian variety show, which featured the original song “My Belly Button."

The special received a “Cheers” in the TV Guide “Cheers and Jeers” column, and 13 episodes were ordered. The host characters were changed to those played by Tim Conway Jr. and McGrath.  The character McGrath played in the special (Nat Caulfield) became a regular talking to tourists outside Universal Studios about a variety of TV related topics.  Each episode contained a variety of TV targets. Most included original music as well as sketch comedy.

The series began airing in the fall of 1990, and ran twice a week, Fridays and Saturdays at 11PM ET. Forty episodes were produced through 1991. Both McGrath and Conway appeared in sketches as well as being the hosts. The rotating supporting cast was called “The Otherwise Unemployed Actors.” A number of actors and actresses made their television debuts on the series including Lisa Kudrow, Kathy Griffin, Kay Heberle, Chip Esten, Mindy Sterling and Julia Sweeney. Some well known actors appeared regularly as guest stars like Rose Marie, Glenn Shadix, Avery Schreiber, Elvira, Phil Hartman, Brian Bonsall, Eve Plumb, and Christopher Knight.

When the series ended, the production company declared bankruptcy after having spent the residuals developing pilots that didn't fly.  Nick-At-Nite's parent company, Viacom, became owner of the show, but had to pay those back residuals before it could air the series again.  Supposedly this is why the series has never gone into syndication. Apparently the cost of paying the writers, actors, and others the residuals involved makes re-airing the series cost-prohibitive.

External links

1990s American satirical television series
1990s American sketch comedy television series
1990 American television series debuts
1991 American television series endings
English-language television shows
Nick at Nite original programming
Television series about television